Sam or Samuel Hill may refer to:

 Sam Hill (euphemism), an American English slang phrase for "the devil" or "hell" personified

People

Sports
 Sam H. Hill (1898–1978), American football coach and sports figure
 Sam Hill (baseball) (1926–1977), American Negro leagues baseball player
 Sam Hill (cyclist) (born 1985), Australian downhill mountain bike racer
 Sam Hill (rugby union) (born 1993), rugby union player

Other people
 Samuel Hill (priest) (died 1716), Anglican priest
 Samuel Hill (engraver) (c. 1765–c. 1809), engraver who worked in Boston, Massachusetts
 Samuel Hill (sea captain) (1777–1825), American merchant sea captain and adventurer
 Samuel W Hill (1815–1889), American surveyor, geologist and mining developer
 Samuel Hill (VC) (1826–1863), Irish recipient of the Victoria Cross
 Samuel Hill (1857–1931), railroad businessman and builder of the Maryhill Museum and Peace Arch
 Samuel B. Hill (Washington politician) (1875–1958), U.S. Representative from the state of Washington
 Samuel B. Hill (Ohio politician) (born 1862), educator and state lawmaker
 Sam Hill (director), American television director and producer

See also 

 Sam Hill House (disambiguation)
 Sam Hill Memorial Bridge, across Columbia River, between the U.S. states of Oregon and Washington
 Giv'at Shmuel ('Samuel's Hill'), a city in the Center District of Israel